Eastern Suburbs Rugby Union Football Club Inc. is a Rugby Union club in Tasmania. Established in 1964, the club is a member of the Tasmanian Rugby Union and Tasmanian Rugby Union Juniors, affiliated with the Australian Rugby Union and plays in the Tasmanian Rugby Union Statewide League.
The club has two eightball teams that represent the club in the South East Tasmanian Eightball Association.
 
The club's home ground is at North Warrane Oval in the City of Clarence. Known as the Roosters or Easts, the club colours are maroon and white. The club currently fields teams in Men's Second Division, a Senior Women's squad and Juniors competitions.

Premierships

Senior team
Premiers First Grade 1981
Premiers Second Grade 2019
R/U First Grade 2016
Statewide Premiers First Grade 1987
Minor Premiers First Grade 1987
Premiers Reserve Grade 1968, 1973, 1974, 1994, 2002 
Minor Premiers Reserve Grade 1999
Finalist First Grade 2014

Juniors
Under 20 - 1979
Under 18 - 1983
Under 16 - 2009
Under 14 - 2007,2008

At the 40 Anniversary of the club's existence Legendary Wallaby Ken Catchpole visited the club to assist with the celebrations.

The club holds two authentic signed Wallaby Guernseys being:
 CH282 Qantas Wallaby Jumper
 CL309 Vodafone Wallaby Jumper

Eightball 
Eastern Suburbs Rugby Union Football Club Inc. fields two teams in the South Eastern Tasmania Eightball Association which is affiliated with Eightball Tasmania, Australian Eight Ball Federation and the World Eightball Pool Federation.

Titles
Premier League Eight Ball Premiers Easts Breakers                2012
A Reserve Premiers                 Easts Roosters(ex East White) 2014
B Division Eight Ball Premiers     Easts White                   2007,2008

Notable representation

R/U 2015 Tasmanian Eightball Singles Title - Alexander Pace(ESRUFC)
Australian Eightball U18 Vice Captain Alexander Pace 2015
Australia 2015 World Junior Team Champions World Eightball Pool Federation - ESRUFC represented by Alexander Pace
2009 Australian Junior Team Champions - Tasmania - Alexander Pace (ESRUFC)

Notable achievements

Legion of Honour Recipients (SETABA) - Max Wessing 2016 and Glen Wessing 2016

See also

Cue sports in Australia

References

External links
Tasmanian Rugby Union
Rugby Australia
South Eastern Tasmanian Eight Ball (Premier League Sides: Easts Roosters)

Archives

Rugby union teams in Tasmania
Women's rugby union in Tasmania
Rugby clubs established in 1964
1964 establishments in Australia
Cue sports teams
Eight Ball teams in Tasmania
Women's rugby union teams in Australia